Carles Aleñá Castillo (born 5 January 1998) is a Spanish professional footballer who plays as a central midfielder for Getafe.

Club career

Barcelona
Born in Mataró, Barcelona, Catalonia, Aleñá moved to Barcelona's youth system, La Masia, in 2005 at the age of 7, after a successful trial. Highly rated by the club, he made his debut with the reserves on 29 August 2015, coming on as a late substitute for David Babunski in a 0–0 Segunda División B home draw against Pobla de Mafumet.

On 24 November 2015, Aleñá scored a spectacular goal in a UEFA Youth League game against Roma. He scored his first senior goal on 19 December, in a Barcelona B 2–4 away loss to Eldense.

Aleñá was first included in Barcelona's main squad on 10 February 2016, remaining an unused substitute in their 1–1 away draw against Valencia in the second leg of 2015-16 Copa del Rey semi-finals. He made his first team debut on 30 November of that year, starting and scoring the equalizer in an away draw against Hércules for the same scoreline, in the same competition.

Aleñá made his La Liga debut on 2 April 2017, coming on as a second-half substitute for Ivan Rakitić in a 4–1 away routing of Granada. On 28 June, he signed a three-year professional deal with Barcelona, including a release clause of €75 million. In July 2018, he was nominated for the Golden Boy award. On 4 December 2018, Aleñá was officially promoted to the first team, two days after scoring his first league goal for Barcelona against Villarreal.

Loan to Real Betis
On 28 December 2019, Barcelona announced that they had reached an agreement with Real Betis for the loan transfer of Aleñá until the end of the season. He played 19 games for the team from Seville, and scored in a 3–0 home win over Osasuna on 8 July.

Loan and permanent transfer to Getafe
On 6 January 2021, it was announced that Barcelona reached an agreement with Getafe over a loan move for Aleñá until the end of the season. On 27 February, he scored his first goal for Getafe after coming off the bench in the final minutes of his team's 3–0 win against Valencia.

On 10 July 2021, Getafe reached an agreement with Barcelona to permanently sign Aleñá for five seasons. Barça also reserved the right to 50% of any future sale of the player, a buy back option plus first right of refusal on any offer.

Personal life
Aleñá's father Francesc was also a footballer; a forward, he played for several clubs in the 1980s and 1990s.

Career statistics

Honours
Barcelona
La Liga: 2018–19
Copa del Rey: 2016–17, 2017–18

Individual
 2015 UEFA European Under-17 Championship Team of the Tournament

References

External links

Profile at the Getafe CF website

1998 births
Living people
People from Mataró
Sportspeople from the Province of Barcelona
Spanish footballers
Footballers from Catalonia
Association football midfielders
La Liga players
Segunda División players
Segunda División B players
FC Barcelona Atlètic players
FC Barcelona players
Real Betis players
Getafe CF footballers
Spain youth international footballers
Spain under-21 international footballers
Catalonia international footballers